was a Japanese politician. He was born in Kumamoto Prefecture. He was a graduate of the University of Tokyo. He was mayor of Kumamoto (1922-1925) and governor of Shiga Prefecture (1925-1926), Nagano Prefecture (1926-1927) and Hyōgo Prefecture (1929-1931). In 1931, he served in the Government-General of Taiwan. He served as Superintendent General in 1934.

References

Japanese Home Ministry government officials
Japanese Police Bureau government officials
Governors of Shiga Prefecture
Governors of Nagano
Governors of Hyōgo Prefecture
Members of the Government-General of Taiwan
University of Tokyo alumni
Kagoshima University alumni
People from Kumamoto Prefecture
1883 births
1957 deaths